Vilovataya is a river in the Murmansk Oblast of Russia, which flows directly into the White Sea. According to the Russian state registry of water, it belongs to the "Barents and White Sea basin district".

References

Rivers of Murmansk Oblast
Drainage basins of the White Sea